Treu Ergeben Hecht (May 1875 - 1937) was an American photographer. Born in Tahiti, he became a photographer in San Francisco, California and negative producer of old photographs from the 1850s onward. His photographs show the early development and evolution of San Francisco. Many of them are held in the San Francisco Public Library.

References

1875 births
1937 deaths
People from Tahiti
Photographers from San Francisco
20th-century American photographers
American expatriates in French Polynesia